Pierre-Hugues Herbert (born 18 March 1991) is a French professional tennis player. In doubles, he has completed the Career Grand Slam with titles at the 2015 US Open, the 2016 Wimbledon Championships, the 2018 French Open, the 2021 French Open, and the 2019 Australian Open partnering Nicolas Mahut. His career-high doubles ranking is World No. 2 achieved on 11 July 2016. The pair have also claimed seven ATP Tour Masters 1000 titles and ATP Finals titles in 2019 and 2021. In singles, Herbert has reached four ATP career finals and achieved his career-high singles ranking of world No. 36 on 11 February 2019.

Junior career
Herbert won the Wimbledon boys' doubles title with partner Kevin Krawietz in 2009, beating French duo of Julien Obry and Adrien Puget in the final. He also reached the 2009 US Open boys' singles semifinals, where he lost to eventual champion Bernard Tomic of Australia. Herbert reached as high as No. 9 in the junior singles world rankings in October 2009.

Professional career

2013
After beginning the year outside the top 250, Herbert rose steadily up the rankings. He qualified for the 2013 Paris Masters, where he defeated Benoît Paire for the loss of only four games in the first round of the main draw – his first ever ATP Tour main draw win. In the second round, he had two set points before losing to Novak Djokovic in straight sets. He ended the year with an ATP singles ranking of 151, compared with 257 12 months earlier.

2014
Herbert made his Grand Slam main draw debut in 2014, first receiving a wildcard into the French Open, where he faced American number 10 seed John Isner in his opening match, losing in three tight sets. He then made it through three rounds of qualifying, beating Borna Ćorić, Daniel Kosakowski and Miloslav Mečíř Jr. to make the main draw at Wimbledon for the first time. In the first round he faced Jack Sock, however lost in four sets despite taking the first set in a tiebreaker. Herbert got his fifth career main draw win at the ATP Tour level at the Swiss Indoors in Basel, beating Édouard Roger-Vasselin in a tight three-setter to set up a clash with 14-time Grand Slam winner Rafael Nadal, his first meeting with a Major champion and former world number 1.

2015: US Open Men's Doubles Champion

Herbert again battled through three rounds of qualifying, beating Hans Podlipnik Castillo, Facundo Argüello and Íñigo Cervantes (the latter over five sets) to make the main draw of Wimbledon. In the first round he beat Hyeon Chung in a three-hour, five-set match, clinching the final set 10–8, claiming his first win in the main draw of a grand slam. In the second round, he lost in straight sets to Bernard Tomic, the player who had beaten him in the semi-finals of Junior US Open in 2009.

In doubles, Herbert reached two Grand Slam finals alongside fellow Frenchman Nicolas Mahut. At the Australian Open, they lost the final to Fabio Fognini and Simone Bolelli. At the US Open, they won the final against Jamie Murray and John Peers, becoming the first all-French pair to win the men's doubles title at the US Open. Their US Open victory marked the sixth time that an all-French pair had won a Grand Slam men's doubles title in the Open Era. On 22 June, Herbert broke into the top 20 in doubles for the first time, reaching a career high of No. 20 in the world.

2016: Wimbledon Gentlemen's Doubles Champion, World No. 2 doubles ranking 
Herbert and Nicolas Mahut won three ATP World Tour Masters 1000 doubles titles in a row in the first half of 2016, in Indian Wells, Miami, and Monte Carlo. At the French Open, he and Mahut, seeded no.1, lost in the third round to Feliciano López and Marc López.

At the 2016 Wimbledon Championships, Herbert and Mahut beat Julien Benneteau and Édouard Roger-Vasselin in the all-French final to win their second grand slam tournament as a team.

2017: Davis Cup Champion
At the 2017 Rotterdam Open, Herbert defeated world no. 8 Dominic Thiem in the quarterfinals for his first singles win over a Top 10-ranked player.  He lost his semifinal to David Goffin.

Herbert and doubles partner Nicolas Mahut won their first title of 2017 together at the Rome Masters defeating Ivan Dodig and Marcel Granollers. They then went on to clinch the Montreal-Cincinnati double winning both of the masters events back-to-back, defeating Rohan Bopanna and Ivan Dodig in three sets at the Coupe Rogers in Montreal and defeating Jamie Murray and Bruno Soares in two sets at the Western & Southern Open in Cincinnati.

In the Davis Cup final against Belgium, Herbert and Richard Gasquet won the doubles match to help France win the Davis cup.

2018: French Open Doubles Champion 
At the 2018 French Open, Hebert and doubles partner Mahut won the French Open, defeating Oliver Marach and Mate Pavić in the final. This was their third Grand Slam title together.

At the ATP Finals in November Herbert at Mahut progressed past the round robin stage of the tournament for the first time in four attempts, they reached the finals before being defeated by Jack Sock and Mike Bryan.

2019: Career doubles Grand Slam, Third final & Career-high ranking in singles, ATP doubles finals winner
In Doha, Herbert's first tournament of the year, he recorded his second top-ten win against Dominic Thiem, before falling to Tomáš Berdych in the quarterfinals. In doubles in Doha Herbert partnered with David Goffin to capture their first team title together.

At the Australian Open in January, Herbert and doubles partner Mahut earned the Career Grand Slam in men's doubles after defeating Henri Kontinen and John Peers in the final. In singles Herbert reached the third round by defeating Hyeon Chung in the second round. In the third round he fell to Milos Raonic in three sets.

After winning the career grand slam in doubles, Herbert decided to take a brief break from doubles to focus on singles.

In February Herbert reached a career high ranking in singles of No. 36 on 11 February 2019 after he reached his third ATP tour final at the 2019 Open Sud de France in Montpellier, where he fell to countryman Jo-Wilfred Tsonga.

In the 2019 clay season in Monte-Carlo Herbert captured his third top 10 win against Kei Nishikori to reach the third round. At the French Open Herbert recovered from being down two-sets-to-love in a five sets match against 12th seed Daniil Medvedev in the first round.

Herbert reunited with Nicolas Mahut to play the Paris Rolex Masters which they won defeating Karen Khachanov and Andrey Rublev in the final. The pair qualified for the ATP finals for the 5th straight year, where they went undefeated in the round robin stage, and then went on to lift the trophy, without dropping a set throughout the tournament. They defeated Raven Klaasen and Michael Venus in the final.

2020
Herbert began the 2020 season at the Qatar ExxonMobil Open. He reached the quarterfinals and lost to second seed and eventual champion, Andrey Rublev. At the Australian Open, he was defeated in the second round by 11th seed David Goffin.

In Montpellier, Herbert upset fifth seed Félix Auger-Aliassime in the second round. He was eliminated in the quarterfinals by second seed David Goffin. At the Rotterdam Open, he played doubles alongside Mahut. They captured their second Rotterdam crown together by beating Henri Kontinen/Jan-Lennard Struff in the final.

2021: Second French Open and ATP Finals doubles titles, fourth ATP singles final

Herbert started his 2021 season at the Antalya Open. He lost in the first round to second seed David Goffin. At the first edition of the Great Ocean Road Open, he was defeated in the second round by 11th seed Jordan Thompson. At the Australian Open, he was eliminated in the first round by 16th seed Fabio Fognini. In Rotterdam, Herbert was beaten in the final round of qualifying by Márton Fucsovics, who would end up reaching the final. 

At the Open 13 in Marseille, he had a great tournament. He won his first two rounds over Kei Nishikori and Cameron Norrie. He then stunned second seed and two-time defending champion, Stefanos Tsitsipas, in the quarterfinals. This was also his first win over a Top-5 ranked player. His victory over fourth seed Ugo Humbert in the semifinals guaranteed him a spot into his fourth ATP singles final. He lost in the championship match to top seed Daniil Medvedev in three sets. 

Competing at the Miami Open, he was defeated in the second round by 11th seed Félix Auger-Aliassime.

Starting his clay-court season at the Monte-Carlo Masters, Herbert fell in the first round of qualifying to Bernard Tomic. Playing in Barcelona, he was eliminated from the tournament in the second round by eighth seed David Goffin. At the Estoril Open, he was beaten in the second round by seventh seed and eventual champion, Albert Ramos Viñolas. Getting past qualifying at the Madrid Open, he lost in the first round to Spaniard Alejandro Davidovich Fokina in three sets. At the Lyon Open, he was defeated in the first round by Sebastian Korda. However, in doubles, he and Mahut reached the final where they lost to Hugo Nys/Tim Pütz. 

At the second Grand Slam of the year, the French Open, he pushed 18th seed Jannik Sinner to five sets, but he ended up losing their first-round match. In doubles, he and Mahut reached the final for the second time in their career. The home favorites saved three match points en route to the final defeating second seeds Juan Sebastián Cabal/Robert Farah. They then defeated pair Alexander Bublik/Andrey Golubev to claim their second French Open doubles title. As a result, Herbert returned to the top 10 doubles rankings at No. 7.

At Wimbledon, Herbert faced Pablo Andújar in the first round. He fought hard and pushed Andújar to five sets but ended up losing the match.

In August, Herbert competed at the Winston-Salem Open. He fell in the final round of qualifying to Wu Tung-lin. However, due to the withdrawal of Nikoloz Basilashvili, he received entry into the main draw as a lucky loser. He reached the third round where he lost to American Marcos Giron. At the US Open, he was defeated in the first round by Adrian Mannarino. In doubles, he and Mahut reached the quarterfinals losing to John Peers/Filip Polášek.

Seeded eighth at the Open d'Orléans, Herbert fell in the second round to Ruben Bemelmans. In doubles, he and compatriot, Albano Olivetti, won the title beating Antoine Hoang/Kyrian Jacquet in the final. Seeded sixth at the Internationaux de Tennis de Vendée, he was beaten in the quarterfinals by qualifier Mats Rosenkranz. In Antwerp, he lost in the final round of qualifying to Brandon Nakashima. Seeded sixth at the Brest Challenger, he was defeated in the first round by Federico Gaio. Playing in Paris as a wildcard, he lost in the first round to Carlos Alcaraz.

2022
In December 2021, Herbert announced that he was unvaccinated against COVID-19 and would miss the 2022 Australian Open as a result. He was replaced as Nicolas Mahut's doubles partner by Fabrice Martin.

At the 2022 Open Sud de France he won as top seed his 23rd title with partner Mahut defeating L. Glasspool/H. Heliövaara. It was their 21st title as a team.

Significant finals

Grand Slam finals

Doubles: 6 (5 titles, 1 runner-up)

Year-end championships

Doubles: 3 (2 titles, 1 runner-up)

Masters 1000 finals

Doubles: 9 (7 titles, 2 runner-ups)

ATP World Tour career finals

Singles: 4 (4 runners-up)

Doubles: 32 (23 titles, 9 runners-ups)

ATP Challenger and ITF Futures finals

Singles: 14 (10–4)

Doubles: 38 (30–8)

Performance timelines
<onlyinclude>
{{Performance key|short=yes}}

Singles
Current through the 2022 Davis Cup.

Doubles

Junior Grand Slam finals

Doubles: 1 (1 title)

Wins over top 10 players

Singles
He has a  record against players who were, at the time the match was played, ranked in the top 10.

Doubles
He has a  record against players who were, at the time the match was played, ranked in the top 10.

References

External links

Profiles
 
 
 
 

1991 births
Living people
People from Schiltigheim
French male tennis players
Australian Open (tennis) champions
French Open champions
Wimbledon champions
Wimbledon junior champions
US Open (tennis) champions
Grand Slam (tennis) champions in men's doubles
Olympic tennis players of France
Tennis players at the 2016 Summer Olympics
Grand Slam (tennis) champions in boys' doubles
Tennis players at the 2020 Summer Olympics
Sportspeople from Bas-Rhin